Nyambari Chacha Mariba Nyangwine (born 7 August 1976) is a Tanzanian CCM politician and Member of Parliament for Tarime constituency since 2010.

References

1976 births
Living people
Chama Cha Mapinduzi MPs
Tanzanian MPs 2010–2015
Mara Secondary School alumni
Mkwawa Secondary School alumni
University of Dar es Salaam alumni